Failure is Not an Option is a phrase associated with NASA Flight Director Gene Kranz and the Apollo 13 Moon landing mission. Although Kranz is often attributed with having spoken those words during the mission, he did not. The origin of the phrase is from the preparation for the 1995 film Apollo 13 according to FDO Flight Controller Jerry Bostick:

Film 

Failure is not an option is the tag line of the 1995 film Apollo 13. It is spoken in the film by Ed Harris, who portrayed Gene Kranz, and said

Gene Kranz autobiography 

Gene Kranz titled his 2000 memoir Failure Is Not An Option . Kranz chose the line as the title because he liked the way it reflected the attitude of mission control. In the book, he states that it was

History Channel documentary 

Failure Is Not an Option is also a presentation on the History Channel documenting the United States' space program with insights from the flight engineers, project managers, flight controllers, astronauts, and others involved inside the National Aeronautics and Space Administration. Speakers include Chris Kraft, Gene Kranz, Jim Lovell, Jerry Bostick, Ed Fendell, Gene Cernan, John Llewellyn, John Aaron, Glynn Lunney, Wally Schirra,  and Gerry Griffin. It takes the viewer from the Launch of Sputnik through the Moon missions. It was produced in 2003.

From the History Channel website:

 see full quote

References

Historical television series
History (American TV channel) original programming
Documentary films about outer space
Apollo 13